The Vail Academy and High School is a school located in the University of Arizona Science and Technology Park. It was founded in 1997 to accommodate the fast-growing community surrounding Vail. It previously served just high school students, but since then, it has become a K-12 school. The school mascot is the Boxer.  Students must complete a senior exit project in order to graduate, as this is a requirement in the Vail Unified School District.

References

External links
Vail Academy and High School k

Public high schools in Arizona
Educational institutions established in 1997
Schools in Tucson, Arizona
Public middle schools in Arizona
Public elementary schools in Arizona
1997 establishments in Arizona